The PTS Galactitol (Gat) Family (TC# 4.A.5) is part of the PTS-AG superfamily. The biochemistry of this family is poorly defined. The only well-characterized member of this family is the galactitol permease of Escherichia coli. However, a homologous IIC protein from Listeria monocytogenes has been shown to be required for D-arabitol fermentation. It presumably functions together with IIAGat and IIBGat homologues. IICGat is distantly related to IICSgc of E. coli; IIAGat is distantly related to IIASga and IIASgcof E. coli as well as IIAMtl and IIAFru. IIBGat is distantly related to IIBSga and IIBSgc of E. coli. Domains in the LicR/CelR family of transcriptional activators show C-terminal domains exhibiting weak sequence similarity to IIBGat and IIAGat.

References 

Prokaryote genes